Douglas Vieira (born June 17, 1960) is a Brazilian judoka and Olympic medalist. Among his best sporting achievements is his silver medal at the 1984 Summer Olympics in Los Angeles.

References

1960 births
Living people
Olympic judoka of Brazil
Judoka at the 1984 Summer Olympics
Olympic silver medalists for Brazil
Olympic medalists in judo
Brazilian male judoka
Medalists at the 1984 Summer Olympics
21st-century Brazilian people
20th-century Brazilian people